Taraira is a town and municipality located in the Vaupés Department, Republic of Colombia.

References
 Taraira

Municipalities of Vaupés Department